Burlington Municipal Airport may refer to:

 Burlington Municipal Airport (Wisconsin), serving Burlington, Wisconsin, United States
 Burlington Municipal Airport (Massachusetts), a former airport serving Burlington, Massachusetts, United States

See also
Burlington Airport (disambiguation)